Cerro Macá is a stratovolcano located to the north of the Aisén Fjord and to the east of the Moraleda Channel, in the Aysén del General Carlos Ibáñez del Campo Region of Chile. This glacier-covered volcano lies along the regional Liquiñe-Ofqui Fault Zone.

Cerro Macá is a relatively small volcano with a volume of only . The edifice is partially eroded and a sector collapse is probably the origin of a large steep sided depression in the summit area. Pyroclastic cones with associated lava flows are found on its southwestern flank but also on the other slopes of the volcano, as far down as sea level and in the Bahia Aysen.

The volcano is part of the southernmost Southern Volcanic Zone of Chile, where volcanism is caused by the subduction of the Nazca Plate. Other volcanoes in the area are Melimoyu, Mentolat, Cay and Cerro Hudson. Macá specifically is formed by basalt and basaltic andesite.

Ash from past eruptions has been tentatively identified close to Cochrane Lake. A more recent eruption occurred from the Bahía Pérez cinder cone on the southwestern flank in 1560 ± 110 years.

In the early 20th century volcanic activity was observed at Ensenada Pérez, close to the southwestern flank of Macá.

See also
List of volcanoes in Chile
List of Ultras of South America

Footnotes

References 
 "Monte Maca, Chile" on Peakbagger

Volcanoes of Aysén Region
Mountains of Chile
Stratovolcanoes of Chile
Holocene stratovolcanoes